Loretta, also known as Edmonium, is a historic home located near Warrenton, Fauquier County, Virginia.  The house was originally constructed about 1800 as a two-story. single-pile dwelling.  In 1907–1908, it was remodeled in the Colonial Revival style. It is a -story, "L"-shaped, three-bay, brick house with a hipped roof built over a raised basement. In addition to the main house the property includes a smokehouse, and a well, both of which date to the early 19th century; and two barns, a corncrib, and two tenant houses, which all date to the early 20th century.

It was listed on the National Register of Historic Places in 1993.

References

Houses on the National Register of Historic Places in Virginia
Colonial Revival architecture in Virginia
Houses completed in 1800
Houses in Fauquier County, Virginia
National Register of Historic Places in Fauquier County, Virginia